XFOIL is an interactive program for the design and analysis of subsonic isolated airfoils. Given the coordinates specifying the shape of a 2D airfoil, Reynolds and Mach numbers, XFOIL can calculate the pressure distribution on the airfoil and hence lift and drag characteristics. The program also allows inverse design - it will vary an airfoil shape to achieve the desired parameters. It is released under the GNU GPL.

History

XFOIL was first developed by Mark Drela at MIT as a design tool for the MIT Daedalus project in the 1980s. It was further developed in collaboration with Harold Youngren. The current version is 6.99, released in December 2013.  Despite its vintage, it is still widely used.

XFOIL is written in FORTRAN.

Similar software 

 XFOIL was translated to the C++ language and integrated in the program XFLR5, principally for use on model aircraft design. 
 A MATLAB implementation called Xfoil for matlab has been written.
 An unrelated program called JavaFoil may be used for similar analysis. It is written in Java.
 Vortexje is an independent panel method implementation in 3D.
 QBlade implements XFOIL via XFLR5 for use in wind turbine design.
 OpenVSP is a parametric aircraft geometry and aerodynamic analysis tool supported by NASA.

References

External links
 The XFOIL home page
 XFLR5

Free computer-aided design software
Free software programmed in Fortran
Computer-aided engineering software for Linux